Desaparecidos is an American punk rock band from Omaha, Nebraska, headed by singer/guitarist Conor Oberst, the frontman of the indie rock band Bright Eyes.

History

Name
Formed in 2001, "desaparecidos" figuratively means "disappeared ones" in Spanish and Portuguese and is a reference to the people who were arrested by various South American right-wing military dictatorships and then vanished without a trace. More specifically, Desaparecidos take their name from the forcibly disappeared under Augusto Pinochet’s right-wing military dictatorship in Chile between 1973 and 1990.

Read Music/Speak Spanish and hiatus (2002-2010)
Desaparecidos broke up in 2002 while the band was attracting an increasingly large following after their debut album Read Music/Speak Spanish, especially touring with Jimmy Eat World and The Promise Ring and being the feature of an MTV You Hear it First episode.  However, Oberst did not have the time to dedicate to the band with the continually increasing success of Bright Eyes. Oberst continued to record with Bright Eyes, while the other members of Desaparecidos went on to form other projects. Matt Baum joined The '89 Cubs, later drumming Race for Titles and the Coffin Killers; Ian McElroy formed Rig 1;  Denver Dalley moved onto bands Statistics and Intramural; Landon Hedges joined (and is currently in) Little Brazil.

Reunion, signing to Epitaph, and second album (2010-present)
Desaparecidos reunited for a single show at the Concert for Equality in Omaha's Benson neighborhood on July 31, 2010. In April 2012, the band launched an official website and announced that they would again reunite, this time to play Omaha's MAHA Fest. In August 2012 the band embarked on a short tour, their first since 2002.

The band released two new tracks, "MariKKKopa" and "Backsell" in August 2012, the first recorded material since their return. The song "MariKKKopa" was written in reference to Sheriff Joe Arpaio of Maricopa County, Arizona and his outspoken stance and civil rights abuses he's committed against undocumented immigrants.

In February 2013, the band made available two tracks, "Anonymous" and "The Left is Right" via stream through Rolling Stone. The songs deal with the Anonymous hacker group and the Occupy movement. On August 2, 2013, the band released a new single "Te Amo Camila Vallejo", b/w "The Underground Man".

On January 27, 2015 the band announced via their Twitter page that they had signed to Epitaph Records. On April 7, Epitaph posted a new Desaparecidos single on YouTube, "City on the Hill."

Desaparecidos released their second album, Payola, in June 2015, thirteen years after Read Music/Speak Spanish. Payola was co-produced with Mike Mogis and was recorded in several batches over the past few years. The album contains the six tracks released since reforming as well as eight additional tracks.

On October 28, 2015, it was announced that Conor Oberst had been hospitalized due to "laryngitis, anxiety, and exhaustion," according to a press release. The entirety of Desaparecidos' remaining tour dates were cancelled and Oberst returned to his hometown of Omaha to recuperate.

Musical style
The band's sound was labeled "full-on emo-in-the-garage" by Alternative Press, "the sort of howlingly tuneful Midwestern punk that disappeared with Hüsker Dü" by Entertainment Weekly, "anthemic thrash" by Rolling Stone, and as such is noted for its sonic differences from Oberst's primary band. They have also been hailed as the "Saddle Creek supergroup". Hailing from Omaha, Nebraska, Desaparecidos' lyrics are mostly about the sociopolitical state of affairs in America. The band has been both lauded and criticized for its intentionally raw sound following the release of Read Music/Speak Spanish. In sharp contrast to Bright Eyes' confessional, even sometimes mournful lyrics, Desaparecidos's angular, energetic and engaging vocals sound like those typically heard in post-hardcore.

Members

Current members
Conor Oberst — vocals, guitar (2001–2002, 2010, 2012–present)
Landon Hedges — bass guitar, vocals (2001–2002, 2010, 2012–present)
Matt Baum — drums (2001–2002, 2010, 2012–present)
Denver Dalley — guitar (2001–2002, 2010, 2012–present)
Ian McElroy — keyboards (2001–2002, 2010, 2012–present)

Discography

Albums
 Read Music/Speak Spanish (2002, Saddle Creek Records)
 Payola (2015,  Epitaph Records)

EPs
 The Happiest Place on Earth (2001, Saddle Creek Records)
 What's New For Fall (2001, Wichita Recordings)
Both EPs contain the same tracks in a different order.

Live 

 Live at Shea Stadium 6.25.15 (2022, Freeman Street Records & Shea Stadium Records)

Singles
 "MariKKKopa" / "Backsell" (2012, self-released)
 "Anonymous" / "The Left is Right" (2013, self-released)
 "Te Amo Camila Vallejo" / "The Underground Man" (2013, self-released)

Compilation albums
NE vs. NC (2002, Redemption Recording Co.)
song: "What's New for Fall"
Saddle Creek 50 (2002, Saddle Creek Records)
songs: "Man and Wife, the Latter (Damaged Goods)," "Popn' Off at the F"
Punk Rock Strike Volume Three: Third Strike (2002, Springman Records)
song: "The Happiest Place On Earth"
Liberation: Songs to Benefit PETA (2003, Fat Wreck Chords)
song: "Man and Wife, the Latter (Damaged Goods)"

See also
The '89 Cubs
Bright Eyes
Little Brazil
Statistics

References

External links
 

Conor Oberst
American emo musical groups
Indie rock musical groups from Nebraska
Musical groups from Omaha, Nebraska
Musical groups established in 2001
Saddle Creek Records artists
Wichita Recordings artists
2001 establishments in Nebraska